Platypezina is a genus of flat-footed flies in the family Platypezidae.

Species
Platypezina diversa (Johnson, 1923)
Platypezina connexa (Boheman, 1858)

References

Platypezidae
Platypezoidea genera